German submarine U-749 was a Type VIIC U-boat of Nazi Germany's Kriegsmarine built for service during World War II. Her keel was laid down on 28 September 1942 by Schichau-Werke of Danzig. She was commissioned on 14 August 1943 with Tenente di vascello Alberto Longhi in command.

Design
German Type VIIC submarines were preceded by the shorter Type VIIB submarines. U- 749 had a displacement of  when at the surface and  while submerged. She had two shafts and two  propellers.

U- 749 was fitted with five  torpedo tubes (four fitted at the bow and one at the stern), fourteen torpedoes, one  SK C/35 naval gun, 220 rounds, and two twin  C/30 anti-aircraft guns. The boat had a complement of between forty-four and sixty.

References

Bibliography

External links

German Type VIIC submarines
World War II submarines of Germany
1943 ships
Ships built in Danzig
Ships built by Schichau
U-boats sunk in 1945
Maritime incidents in April 1945
World War II submarines of Italy